Gilmar Ferreira Mendes (born December 30, 1955) is a Brazilian Justice of the Supremo Tribunal Federal (Brazilian Supreme Federal Court), appointed by then President Fernando Henrique Cardoso in 2002. Mendes was also the Chief Justice for the 2008–2010 term and the Attorney General from 2000 to 2002.

He has been criticised by legal scholars and journalists for the supposedly opportunistic political motivations of his rulings, and mocked for his alleged penchant for freeing powerful politicians suspected of corruption. In 2009, fellow Justice Joaquim Barbosa confronted him during a televised session of the Court, comparing him to a local criminal leader who commanded "thugs".

Early life
Mendes was born in Diamantino, Mato Grosso. He graduated with a bachelor's degree in Law from University of Brasília, received his master's degree in Law from the same university, another master's degree in Law from University of Münster (Westfälische Wilhelms-Universität Münster) with the dissertation "Presupposed Admissibility of the Abstract Norm Control in the Federal Constitutional Court" (Die Zulassigkeitsvoraussetzungen der abstrakten Normenkontrolle vor dem Bundesverfassungsgericht) and a PhD in Law from the same university with the thesis "Abstract Norm Control in the Federal Constitutional Court and the Brazilian Supremo Tribunal Federal (Die abstrakte Normenkontrolle vor dem Bundesverfassungsgericht und vor dem brasilianischen Supremo Tribunal Federal).

Career as Supreme Court Justice

Gilmar Mendes was assigned to the Supreme Court by presidente Fernando Henrique Cardoso. During his tenure, Mendes took the position of vice-Chief Justice (2006-2008) and then took oath as Chief Justice (2008-2010). Mendes was also president of the Nacional Justice Council (2008-2010), and implemented a national plan to modernize Brazilian Justice, which resulted in the judgement of 2.72 million old cases (dated before 2006). During his tenure, other measures were taken to enhance dynamism and efficiency in the Brazilian judicial system, such as the creation of the Electronic judicial process and the lower criminal and civil virtual courts, among others.

In addition to his role as a leading judge, Mendes has contributed to doctrine and research, having published many books, articles and participated in academic events.

Controversies, scandals and accusations of corruption
Gilmar Mendes was the least supported nomination to the Supreme Court ever approved by the senate, with three times more senators voting against him than the next most rejected justice, . Shortly before confirmation, Mendes was accused of paying R$32K with funds from the Attorney General's office to a law school prep course owned by then-president Fernando Henrique Cardoso who he still served as attorney general at that time.

In July 2008, Gilmar Mendes granted two habeas corpus to the Brazilian financier Daniel Dantas, investigated and arrested by the federal police in operation Satiagraha. Mr. Dantas was arrested and released by Gilmar Mendes' order twice in less than two days. Political bloggers and political personalities started to refer to him as "Gilmar Dantas" after that episode, highlighting his deep connections to the interests of Dantas. Shortly after the second habeas corpus, a group of 134 active federal judges and personalities signed a petition supporting the judge who had issued the arrest warranties against Dantas, judge , against Mendes' decision. In the same occasion, Mendes accused the Federal Police of tapping his phone, claiming that Brazil was becoming a police state under President Lula and his appointee for the federal police, . Gilmar Mendes was never able to show any evidence of the tapping, but the attention given the supposed scandal by the Brazilian media eventually ousted Lacerda from his position.

Around the same time in 2008, the Brazilian weekly magazine CartaCapital published a piece on the scandals surrounding Gilmar Mendes, denouncing his connection with the law school prep course among other ethically dubious conduct from the justice, particularly paying R$8 million to buy his partner's share out in the endeavor as a way to silence him about how the institute was administered. Mr. Mendes sued the publication, saying that the article was "denigrating his public image" and "hurting his credibility". In November 2010, judge Adriana Sachsida Garcia, from the Tribunal of Justice of the State of São Paulo dismissed Mr. Mendes' claims.

In August, 2012, Gilmar Mendes asked the Brazilian Federal Police to investigate Wikipedia. According to the newspaper O Estado de S. Paulo, he argues that the Portuguese language Wikipedia's article showcasing his biography uses "journalistic sources" which are not adequate for an "informative article". The sources he referred to were from a weekly magazine that gathered denunciations of corruption involving him.

In April 2013, Gilmar Mendes was again in controversy, blocking legislation that would have imposed checks and balances to the power of the Brazilian Supreme Court, claiming that the legislation would be unconstitutional. Never before in Brazilian history had the judiciary branch intervened to stop a law or constitutional amendment before it was even debated and approved by the people's representatives.

References

External links
Mendes celebrates the 1988 Brazilian constitution at Harvard Law School in the Harvard Law Record

1955 births
Living people
Supreme Federal Court of Brazil justices
21st-century Brazilian judges
Brazilian politicians
People from Mato Grosso
University of Münster alumni
Vaza Jato
Attorneys General of Brazil